This list of Jewish mathematicians includes mathematicians and statisticians who are or were verifiably Jewish or of Jewish descent. In 1933, when the Nazis rose to power in Germany, one-third of all mathematics professors in the country were Jewish, while Jews constituted less than one percent of the population. Jewish mathematicians made major contributions throughout the 20th century and into the 21st, as is evidenced by their high representation among the winners of major mathematics awards: 27% for the Fields Medal, 30% for the Abel Prize, and 40% for the Wolf Prize.

A
 Abner of Burgos ( 1270– 1347), mathematician and philosopher
 Abraham Abigdor (14th century), logician
 Milton Abramowitz (1915–1958), mathematician
 Samson Abramsky (born 1953), game semantics
 Amir Aczel (1950–2015), history of mathematics
 Georgy Adelson-Velsky (1922–2014), mathematician and computer scientist
 Abraham Adelstein (1916–1992), statistics
 Caleb Afendopolo ( 1430– 1499), mathematician, astronomer, poet, and rabbi
 Aaron Afia (16th century), mathematician, physician and philosopher
 Shmuel Agmon (born 1922), mathematical analysis and partial differential equations
 Matest Agrest (1915–2005), mathematician and pseudoscientist
 Ron Aharoni (born 1952), combinatorics
 Bendich Ahin (14th century), mathematician and physician 
 Michael Aizenman (born 1945), mathematician and physicist
 Naum Akhiezer (1901–1980), approximation theory
 Isaac Albalia (1035–1094), mathematician, astronomer, and Talmudist
 Abraham Adrian Albert (1905–1972), algebra; Cole Prize (1939)
 Félix Alcan (1841–1925), mathematician
 Semyon Alesker (born 1972), convex and integral geometry; Erdős Prize (2004)
 Al-Samawal al-Maghribi ( 1130– 1180), mathematician, astronomer and physician
 Noga Alon (born 1956), combinatorics and theoretical computer science; Erdős Prize (1989), Pólya Prize (2000)
 Franz Alt (1910–2011), mathematician and computer scientist
 Shimshon Amitsur (1921–1994), mathematician
 Jacob Anatoli ( 1194–1256), mathematician, scientist and translator
 Aldo Andreotti (1924–1980), mathematician
 Kenneth Appel (1932–2013), proved four-color theorem
 Zvi Arad (1942–2018), mathematician
 Vladimir Arnold (1937–2010), mathematician; Wolf Prize (2001)
 Siegfried Aronhold (1819–1884), invariant theory
 Nachman Aronszajn (1907–1980), mathematical analysis and mathematical logic
 Kenneth Arrow (1921–2017), mathematician and economist; Nobel Prize in Economics (1972)
 Michael Artin (born 1934), algebraic geometry
 Emilio Artom (1888–1952), mathematician
 Giulio Ascoli (1843–1869), mathematician
 Guido Ascoli (1887–1957), mathematician
 Herman Auerbach (1901–1942), mathematician
 Robert Aumann (born 1930), mathematician and game theorist; Nobel Prize in Economics (2005)
 Louis Auslander (1928–1997), mathematician
 Maurice Auslander (1926–1994), algebra
 Hertha Ayrton (1854–1923), mathematician and engineer

B
 Isaak Bacharach (1854–1942), mathematician
 Reinhold Baer (1902–1979), algebra
 Egon Balas (1922–2019), applied mathematics
 Yehoshua Bar-Hillel (1915–1975), mathematician, philosopher and linguist
 Abraham bar Hiyya (1070–1136 or 1145), mathematician, astronomer and philosopher
 Dror Bar-Natan (born 1966), knot theory and homology theory
 Ruth Barcan Marcus (1921–2012), logician
 Grigory Barenblatt (1927–2018), mathematician
 Valentine Bargmann (1908–1989), mathematician and theoretical physicist
 Elijah Bashyazi ( 1420–1490), mathematician, astronomer, philosopher and rabbi
 Hyman Bass (born 1932), algebra and mathematics education; Cole Prize (1975)
 Laurence Baxter (1954–1996), statistician
 August Beer (1825–1863), mathematician
 Alexander Beilinson (born 1957), mathematician; Wolf Prize (2018)
 Richard Bellman (1920–1984), applied mathematics
 Kalonymus ben Kalonymus (1286– 1328), philosopher, mathematician and translator
 Isaac ben Moses Eli (15th century), mathematician
 Jacob ben Nissim (10th century), philosopher and mathematician
 Judah ben Solomon ( 1215– 1274), mathematician, astronomer, and philosopher
 Paul Benacerraf (born 1931), philosophy of mathematics
 Lazarus Bendavid (1762–1832), mathematician and philosopher
 Felix Berezin (1931–1980), mathematician and physicist
 Boris Berezovsky (1946–2013), mathematician and businessman
 Toby Berger (born 1940), information theory
 Stefan Bergman (1895–1977), complex analysis
 Paul Bernays (1888–1977), foundations of mathematics
 Benjamin Abram Bernstein (1881–1964), mathematical logic
 Dorothy Lewis Bernstein (1914–1988), applied mathematics
 Felix Bernstein (1878–1956), set theory
 Joseph Bernstein (born 1945), algebraic geometry, representation theory, and number theory
 Sergei Bernstein (1880–1968), mathematician
 Lipman Bers (1914–1993), mathematical analysis
 Ludwig Berwald (1883–1942), differential geometry
 Abram Besicovitch (1891–1970), mathematician (Karaite)
 Paul Biran (born 1969), symplectic and algebraic geometry; Erdős Prize (2006)
 Joan Birman (born 1927), topology
 Zygmunt Wilhelm Birnbaum (1903–2000), functional analysis and probability
 Max Black (1909–1988), philosopher of mathematics
 André Bloch (1893–1948), complex analysis
 Maurice Block (1816–1901), statistician
 Lenore Blum (born 1942), mathematician and computer scientist
 Leonard Blumenthal (1901–1984), mathematician
 Otto Blumenthal (1876–1944), mathematician
 Harald Bohr (1887–1951), almost periodic functions
 Vladimir Boltyansky (1925–2019), mathematician and educator
 Carl Borchardt (1817–1880), mathematical analysis
 Max Born (1882–1970), physicist and mathematician
 Moses Botarel Farissol (15th century), mathematician
 Salomon Bochner (1899–1982), mathematician; Steele Prize (1979)
 Hermann Bondi (1919–2005), mathematician
 Immanuel Bonfils ( 1300–1377), mathematician and astronomer
 Valentina Borok (1931–2004), partial differential equations
 David Borwein (1924–2021), mathematician
 Jonathan Borwein (1951–2016), mathematician
 Peter Borwein (1953–2020), mathematician
 Raoul Bott (1923–2005), geometry; Steele Prize (1990)
 Victor Brailovsky (born 1935), mathematician and computer scientist
 Achi Brandt (born 1938), numerical analysis
 Nikolai Brashman (1796–1866), analytical geometry; Demidov Prize (1836)
 Alfred Brauer (1894–1985), number theory
 Richard Brauer (1901–1977), modular representation theory; Cole Prize (1949)
 Haïm Brezis (born 1944), functional analysis and partial differential equations
 Selig Brodetsky (1888–1954), mathematician and President of the Board of Deputies of British Jews
 Jacob Bronowski (1908–1974), mathematician and science educator
 Robert Brooks (1952–2002), complex analysis and differential geometry
 Felix Browder (1927–2016), nonlinear functional analysis
 William Browder (born 1934), topology and differential geometry
 Leonid Bunimovich (born 1947), dynamical systems
 Leone Burton (1936–2007), mathematics education
 Herbert Busemann (1905–1994), convex and differential geometry

C
 Anneli Cahn Lax (1922–1999), mathematician
 Eugenio Calabi (born 1923), mathematician; Steele Prize (1991)
 Georg Cantor (1845–1918), set theorist
 Moritz Cantor (1829–1920), historian of mathematics
 Sylvain Cappell (born 1946), geometric topology
 Leonard Carlitz (1907–1999), number theory and algebra
 Moshe Carmeli (1933–2007), mathematical physics
 Emma Castelnuovo (1913–2014), mathematics education
 Guido Castelnuovo (1865–1952), mathematician
 Wilhelm Cauer (1900–1945), mathematician
 Yair Censor (born 1943), computational mathematics and optimization
 Gregory Chaitin (born 1947), algorithmic information theory and metamathematics
 Herman Chernoff (born 1923), applied mathematics and statistics
 Alexey Chervonenkis (1938–2014), mathematician and computer scientist
 David Chudnovsky (born 1947), mathematician and engineer
 Gregory Chudnovsky (born 1952), mathematician and engineer
 Maria Chudnovsky (born 1977), graph theory and combinatorial optimization
 Henri Cohen (born 1947), number theory
 Irvin Cohen (1917–1955), mathematician
 Joel Cohen (born 1944), mathematical biology
 Marion Cohen (born 1943), poet and mathematician
 Miriam Cohen (born 1941), algebra
 Paul Cohen (1934–2007), set theorist; Fields Medal (1966)
 Ralph Cohen (born 1952), algebraic topology and differential topology
 Wim Cohen (1923–2000), queueing theory
 Paul Cohn (1924–2006), algebraist
 Stephan Cohn-Vossen (1902–1936), differential geometry
 Ronald Coifman (born 1941), mathematician
 Mordecai Comtino (died  1485), mathematician
 Lionel Cooper (1915–1979), mathematician
 Leo Corry (born 1956), history of mathematics
 Mischa Cotlar (1913–2007), mathematician
 Richard Courant (1888–1972), mathematical analysis and applied mathematics
 Nathan Court (1881–1968), geometer
 Michael Creizenach (1789–1842), mathematician and theologian
 Luigi Cremona (1830–1903), mathematician
 Alexander Crescenzi (17th century), mathematician

D
 Noah Dana-Picard (born 1954), mathematician
 Henry Daniels (1912–2000), statistician
 David van Dantzig (1900–1959), topology
 George Dantzig (1914–2005), mathematical optimization
 Tobias Dantzig (1884–1956), mathematician
 Martin Davis (1928–2023), mathematician
 Philip Dawid (born 1946), statistics
 Max Dehn (1878–1952), topology
 Percy Deift (born 1945), mathematician; Pólya Prize (1998)
 Nissan Deliatitz (19th century), mathematician
 Joseph Delmedigo (1591–1655), rabbi and mathematician
 Ely Devons (1913–1967), statistics
 Persi Diaconis (born 1945), mathematician and magician
 Samuel Dickstein (1851–1939), mathematician and pedagogue
 Nathan Divinsky (1925–2012), mathematician
 Roland Dobrushin (1929–1995), probability theory, mathematical physics and information theory
 Wolfgang Doeblin (1915–1940), probabilist
 Domninus of Larissa ( 420– 480 AD), mathematician
 Jesse Douglas (1897–1965), mathematician; Fields Medal (1936), Bôcher Prize (1943)
 Vladimir Drinfeld (born 1954), algebraic geometry; Fields Medal (1990), Wolf Prize (2018)
 Louis Israel Dublin (1882–1969), statistician
 Aryeh Dvoretzky (1916–2008), functional analysis and probability
 Bernard Dwork (1923–1998), mathematician; Cole Prize (1962)
 Harry Dym (born 1938), functional and numerical analysis
 Eugene Dynkin (1924–2014), probability and algebra; Steele Prize (1993)

E
 Abraham Eberlen (16th century), mathematician
 Ishak Efendi ( 1774–1835), mathematician and engineer
 Bradley Efron (born 1938), statistician
 Andrew Ehrenberg (1926–2010), statistician
 Tatyana Ehrenfest (1905–1984), mathematician
 Leon Ehrenpreis (1930–2010), mathematician
 Jacob Eichenbaum (1796–1861), poet and mathematician
 Samuel Eilenberg (1913–1988), category theory; Wolf Prize (1986), Steele Prize (1987)
 Gotthold Eisenstein (1823–1852), mathematician
 Yakov Eliashberg (born 1946), symplectic topology and partial differential equations
 Jordan Ellenberg (born 1971), arithmetic geometry
 Emanuel Lodewijk Elte (1881–1943), mathematician 
 David Emmanuel (1854–1941), mathematician
 Federigo Enriques (1871–1946), algebraic geometry
 Moses Ensheim (1750–1839), mathematician and poet
 Bernard Epstein (1920–2005), mathematician and physicist
 David Epstein (born 1937), hyperbolic geometry, 3-manifolds, and group theory
 Paul Epstein (1871–1939), number theory
 Paul S. Epstein (1883–1966), mathematical physics
 Yechiel Michel Epstein (1829–1908), rabbi and mathematician
 Arthur Erdélyi (1908–1977), mathematician
 Paul Erdős (1913–1996), mathematician; Cole Prize (1951), Wolf Prize (1983/84)
 Alex Eskin (born 1965), dynamical systems and group theory
 Gregory Eskin (born 1936), partial differential equations
 Theodor Estermann (1902–1991), analytic number theory

F
 Gino Fano (1871–1952), mathematician
 Yehuda Farissol (15th century), mathematician and astronomer
 Gyula Farkas (1847–1930), mathematician and physicist
 Herbert Federer (1920–2010), geometric measure theory
 Solomon Feferman (1928–2016), mathematical logic and philosophy of mathematics
 Charles Fefferman (born 1949), mathematician; Fields Medal (1978), Bôcher Prize (2008)
 Joan Feigenbaum (born 1958), mathematics and computer science
 Mitchell Feigenbaum (1944–2019), chaos theory; Wolf Prize (1986)
 Walter Feit (1930–2004), finite group theory and representation theory; Cole Prize (1965)
 Leopold Fejér (1880–1959), harmonic analysis
 Michael Fekete (1886–1957), mathematician
 Jacques Feldbau (1914–1945), mathematician
 Joel Feldman (born 1949), mathematical physics
 William Feller (1906–1970), probability theory
 Käte Fenchel (1905–1983), group theory
 Werner Fenchel (1905–1988), geometry and optimization theory
 Mordechai Finzi ( 1407–1476), mathematician and astronomer
 Ernst Sigismund Fischer (1875–1954), mathematical analysis
 Irene Fischer (1907–2009), mathematician and engineer
 John Fox (born 1946), statistician
 Abraham Fraenkel (1891–1965), set theory
 Aviezri Fraenkel (born 1929), combinatorial game theory
 Philipp Frank (1884–1966), mathematical physics and philosophy
 Péter Frankl (born 1953), combinatorics
 Fabian Franklin (1853–1939), mathematician
 Michael Freedman (born 1951), mathematician; Fields Medal (1986)
 Gregory Freiman (born 1926), additive number theory
 Edward Frenkel (born 1968), representation theory, algebraic geometry, and mathematical physics
 Hans Freudenthal (1905–1990), algebraic topology
 Avner Friedman (born 1932), partial differential equations
 Harvey Friedman (born 1948), reverse mathematics
 Sy Friedman (born 1953), set theory and recursion theory
 David Friesenhausen (1756–1828), mathematician
 Uriel Frisch (born 1940), mathematical physics
 Albrecht Fröhlich (1916–2001), algebra; De Morgan Medal (1992)
 Robert Frucht (1906–1997), graph theory
 Guido Fubini (1879–1943), mathematical analysis
 László Fuchs (born 1924), group theory
 Lazarus Fuchs (1833–1902), linear differential equations
 Paul Funk (1886–1969), mathematical analysis
 Hillel Furstenberg (born 1935), mathematician; Wolf Prize (2006/07), Abel Prize (2020)

G
 David Gabai (born 1954), low-dimensional topology and hyperbolic geometry
 Dov Gabbay (born 1945), logician
 Ofer Gabber (born 1958), algebraic geometry; Erdős Prize (1981)
 Boris Galerkin (1871–1945), mathematician and engineer
 Zvi Galil (born 1947), mathematician and computer scientist
 David Gans (1541–1613), mathematician
 Hilda Geiringer (1893–1973), mathematician
 Israel Gelfand (1913–2009), mathematician; Kyoto Prize (1989), Steele Prize (2005)
 Alexander Gelfond (1906–1968), number theory
 Semyon Gershgorin (1901–1933), mathematician
 Gersonides (1288–1344), mathematician
 Murray Gerstenhaber (born 1927), algebra and mathematical physics
 David Gilbarg (1918–2001), mathematician
 Jekuthiel Ginsburg (1889–1957), mathematician
 Moti Gitik (born 1955), set theory
 Samuel Gitler (1933–2014), mathematician
 Alexander Givental (born 1958), symplectic topology and singularity theory
 George Glauberman (born 1941), finite simple groups
 Israel Gohberg (1928–2009), operator theory and functional analysis
 Anatolii Goldberg (1930–2008), complex analysis
 Lisa Goldberg (born 1956), statistics and mathematical finance
 Dorian Goldfeld (born 1947), number theory; Cole Prize (1987)
 Carl Wolfgang Benjamin Goldschmidt (1807–1851), mathematician
 Catherine Goldstein (born 1958), number theory
 Sydney Goldstein (1903–1989), mathematical physics
 Daniel Goldston (born 1954), number theory; Cole Prize (2014)
 Michael Golomb (1909–2008), mathematician
 Solomon Golomb (1932–2016), mathematical games
 Gene Golub (1932–2007), numerical analysis
 Marty Golubitsky (born 1945), mathematician
 Benjamin Gompertz (1779–1865), mathematician
 I. J. Good (1916–2009), mathematician and cryptologist
 Paul Gordan (1837–1912), invariant theory
 Daniel Gorenstein (1923–1992), group theory
 David Gottlieb (1944–2008), numerical analysis
 Dovid Gottlieb, rabbi and mathematician
 Ian Grant (born 1930), mathematical physics
 Harold Grad (1923–1986), applied mathematics
 Eugene Grebenik (1919–2001), demographer
 Leslie Greengard (born 1958), mathematician and computer scientist
 Kurt Grelling (1886–1942), logician
 Mikhail Gromov (born 1943), mathematician; Wolf Prize (1993), Kyoto Prize (2002), Abel Prize (2009)
 Benedict Gross (born 1950), number theory; Cole Prize (1987)
 Marcel Grossmann (1878–1936), descriptive geometry
 Emil Grosswald (1912–1989), number theory
 Alexander Grothendieck (1928–2014), algebraic geometry; Fields Medal (1966)
 Branko Grünbaum (1929–2018), discrete geometry
 Géza Grünwald (1910–1943), mathematician
 Heinrich Guggenheimer (1924–2021), mathematician
 Paul Guldin (1577–1643), mathematician and astronomer
 Emil Gumbel (1891–1966), extreme value theory
 Sigmund Gundelfinger (1846–1910), algebraic geometry
 Larry Guth (born 1977), mathematician
 Louis Guttman (1916–1987), mathematician and sociologist

H
 Alfréd Haar (1885–1933), mathematician
 Steven Haberman (born 1951), statistician and actuarial scientist
Jacques Hadamard (1865–1963), mathematician
 Hans Hahn (1879–1934), mathematical analysis and topology
 John Hajnal (1924–2008), statistics
 Heini Halberstam (1926–2014), number theory
 Paul Halmos (1916–2006), mathemematician; Steele Prize (1983)
 Israel Halperin (1911–2007), mathematician
 Georges-Henri Halphen (1844–1889), geometer
 Hans Hamburger (1889–1956), mathematician
 Haim Hanani (1912–1991), combinatorial design theory
 Frank Harary (1921–2005), graph theory
 David Harbater (born 1952), Galois theory, algebraic geometry and arithmetic geometry; Cole Prize (1995)
 David Harel (born 1950), mathematician and computer scientist
 Sergiu Hart (born 1949), mathematician and economist
 Ami Harten (1946–1994), applied mathematics
 Numa Hartog (1846–1871), mathematician
 Friedrich Hartogs (1874–1943), set theory and several complex variables
 Helmut Hasse (1898–1979), algebraic number theory
 Herbert Hauptman (1917–2011), mathematician; Nobel Prize in Chemistry (1985)
 Felix Hausdorff (1868–1942), topology
 Louise Hay (1935–1989), computability theory
 Walter Hayman (1926–2020), complex analysis
 Hans Heilbronn (1908–1975), mathematician
 Ernst Hellinger (1883–1950), mathematician
 Eduard Helly (1884–1943), mathematician
 Dagmar Henney (born 1931), mathematician
 Kurt Hensel (1861–1941), mathematician
 Reuben Hersh (1927–2020), mathematics and philosopher of mathematics
 Daniel Hershkowitz (born 1953), mathematician and politician
 Israel Herstein (1923–1988), algebra
 Maximilian Herzberger (1899–1982), mathematician and physicist
 Emil Hilb (1882–1929), mathematician
 Peter Hilton (1923–2010), homotopy theory
 Edith Hirsch Luchins (1921–2002), mathematician
 Kurt Hirsch (1906–1986), group theory
 Morris Hirsch (born 1933), mathematician
 Elias Höchheimer (18th century), mathematician and astronomer
 Gerhard Hochschild (1915–2010), mathematician; Steele Prize (1980)
 Melvin Hochster (born 1943), commutative algebra; Cole Prize (1980)
 Douglas Hofstadter (born 1945), recreational mathematics
 Chaim Samuel Hönig (1926–2018), functional analysis
 Heinz Hopf (1894–1971), topology
 Ludwig Hopf (1884–1939), mathematician and physicist
 Janina Hosiasson-Lindenbaum (1899–1942), logician and philosopher
 Isaac Hourwich (1860–1924), statistician
 Ehud Hrushovski (born 1959), mathematical logic; Erdős Prize (1994)
 Witold Hurewicz (1904–1956), mathematician
 Adolf Hurwitz (1859–1919), function theory
 Wallie Abraham Hurwitz (1886–1958), mathematical analysis

I
 Isaac ibn al-Ahdab (1350–1430), mathematician, astronomer and poet
 Sind ibn Ali (9th century), mathematician and astronomer
 Mashallah ibn Athari ( 740–815), mathematician and astrologer
 Sahl ibn Bishr ( 786– 845), mathematician
 Abraham ibn Ezra ( 1089– 1167), mathematician and astronomer
 Abu al-Fadl ibn Hasdai (11th century), mathematician and philosopher
 Bashar ibn Shu'aib (10th century), mathematician
 Issachar ibn Susan ( 1539–1572), mathematician
 Jacob ibn Tibbon (1236–1305), mathematician and astronomer
 Moses ibn Tibbon ( 1240–1283), mathematician and translator
 Judah ibn Verga (15th century), mathematician, astronomer and kabbalist
 Arieh Iserles (born 1947), computational mathematics
 Isaac Israeli (14th century), astronomer and mathematician
 Israel Joffe (born 1979), Harvard IT graduate and Mathematician

J
 Eri Jabotinsky (1910–1969), mathematician, politician and activist
 Carl Gustav Jacob Jacobi (1804–1851), analysis; first Jewish mathematician to be appointed professor at a German university
 Nathan Jacobson (1910–1999), algebra; Steele Prize (1998)
 Ernst Jacobsthal (1882–1965), number theory
 E. Morton Jellinek (1890–1963), biostatistics
 Svetlana Jitomirskaya (born 1966), dynamical systems and mathematical physics
 Ferdinand Joachimsthal (1818–1861), mathematician
 Fritz John (1910–1994), partial differential equations; Steele Prize (1982)
 Joseph of Spain (9th and 10th centuries), mathematician
 Sir Roger Jowell (1942–2011), social statistics

K
 Mark Kac (1914–1984), probability theory
 Victor Kac (born 1943), representation theory; Steele Prize (2015)
 Mikhail Kadets (1923–2011), mathematical analysis
 Richard Kadison (1925–2018), mathematician; Steele Prize (1999)
 Veniamin Kagan (1869–1953), mathematician
 William Kahan (born 1933), mathematician and computer scientist; Turing Award (1989)
 Jean-Pierre Kahane (1926–2017), harmonic analysis
 Franz Kahn (1926–1998), mathematician and astrophysicist
 Margarete Kahn (1880–1942?), topology
 Gil Kalai (born 1955), mathematician; Pólya Prize (1992), Erdős Prize (1992)
 László Kalmár (1905–1976), mathematical logic
 Shoshana Kamin (born 1930), partial differential equations
 Daniel Kan (1927–2013), homotopy theory
 Leonid Kantorovich (1912–1986), mathematician and economist; Nobel Prize in Economics (1975)
 Irving Kaplansky (1917–2006), mathematician
 Samuel Karlin (1924–2007), mathematician
 Theodore von Kármán (1881–1963), mathematical physics
 Edward Kasner (1878–1955), differential geometry
 Svetlana Katok (born 1947), mathematician
 Eric Katz (born 1977), combinatorial algebraic geometry and arithmetic geometry
 Mikhail Katz (born 1958), differential geometry and geometric topology
 Nets Katz (born 1972), combinatorics and harmonic analysis
 Nick Katz (born 1943), algebraic geometry
 Sheldon Katz (born 1956), algebraic geometry
 Victor Katz (born 1942), algebra and history of mathematics
 Yitzhak Katznelson (born 1934), mathematician
 Bruria Kaufman (1918–2010), mathematician and physicist
 David Kazhdan (born 1946), representation theory
 Herbert Keller (1925–2008), applied mathematics and numerical analysis
 Joseph Keller (1923–2016), applied mathematician; National Medal of Science (1988), Wolf Prize (1997)
 John Kemeny (1926–1992), mathematician and computer scientist
 Carlos Kenig (born 1953), harmonic analysis and partial differential equations; Bôcher Prize (2008)
 Harry Kesten (1931–2019), probability; Pólya Prize (1994), Steele Prize (2001)
 Aleksandr Khinchin (1894–1959), probability theory
 David Khorol (1920–1990), mathematician
 Mojżesz Kirszbraun (1903–1942), mathematical analysis
 Sergiu Klainerman (born 1950), hyperbolic differential equations; Bôcher Prize (1999)
 Boáz Klartag (born 1978), asymptotic geometric analysis; Erdős Prize (2010)
 Morris Kline (1908–1992), mathematician
 Lipót Klug (1854–1945), mathematician
 Hermann Kober (1888–1973), mathematical analysis
 Simon Kochen (born 1934), model theory and number theory; Cole Prize (1967)
 Joseph Kohn (born 1932), partial differential operators and complex analysis
 Ernst Kolman (1892–1972), philosophy of mathematics
 Dénes Kőnig (1884–1944), graph theorist
 Gyula Kőnig (1849–1913), mathematician
 Leo Königsberger (1837–1921), historian of mathematics
 Arthur Korn (1870–1945), mathematician and inventor
 Thomas Körner (born 1946), mathematician
 Stephan Körner (1913–2000), philosophy of mathematics
 Bertram Kostant (1928–2017), mathematician
 Edna Kramer (1902–1984), mathematician
 Mark Krasnosel'skii (1920–1997), nonlinear functional analysis
 Mark Krein (1907–1989), functional analysis; Wolf Prize (1982)
 Cecilia Krieger (1894–1974), mathematician
 Georg Kreisel (1923–2015), mathematical logic
 Maurice Kraitchik (1882–1957), number theory and recreational mathematics
 Leopold Kronecker (1823–1891), number theory
 Joseph Kruskal (1928–2010), graph theory and statistics
 Martin Kruskal (1925–2006), mathematician and physicist
 William Kruskal (1919–2005), non-parametric statistics
 Kazimierz Kuratowski (1896–1980), mathematics and logic
 Simon Kuznets (1901–1985), statistician and economist; Nobel Prize in Economics (1971)

L
 Imre Lakatos (1922–1974), philosopher of mathematics
 Dan Laksov (1940–2013), algebraic geometry
 Cornelius Lanczos (1893–1974), mathematician and physicist
 Edmund Landau (1877–1938), number theory and complex analysis
 Georg Landsberg (1865–1912), complex analysis and algebraic geometry
 Serge Lang (1927–2005), number theory; Cole Prize (1960)
 Emanuel Lasker (1868–1941), mathematician and chess player
 Albert Lautman (1908–1944), philosophy of mathematics
 Ruth Lawrence (born 1971), knot theory and algebraic topology
 Peter Lax (born 1926), mathematician; Wolf Prize (1987), Steele Prize (1993), Abel Prize (2005)
 Joel Lebowitz (born 1930), mathematical physics
 Gilah Leder (born 1941), mathematics education
 Walter Ledermann (1911–2009), algebra
 Solomon Lefschetz (1884–1972), algebraic topology and ordinary differential equations; Bôcher Prize (1924)
 Emma Lehmer (1906–2007), algebraic number theory
 Moses Lemans (1785–1832), mathematician
 Alexander Lerner (1913–2004), applied mathematics
 Arthur Levenson (1914–2007), mathematician and cryptographer
 Beppo Levi (1875–1961), mathematician
 Eugenio Levi (1883–1917), mathematician
 Friedrich Levi (1888–1966), algebra
 Leone Levi (1821–1888), statistician
 Raphael Levi Hannover (1685–1779), mathematician and astronomer
 Tullio Levi-Civita (1873–1941), tensor calculus
 Dany Leviatan (born 1942), approximation theory
 Boris Levin (1906–1993), function theory
 Leonid Levin (born 1948), foundations of mathematics and computer science
 Norman Levinson (1912–1975), mathematician; Bôcher Prize (1953)
 Boris Levitan (1914–2004), almost periodic functions
 Jacob Levitzki (1904–1956), mathematician
 Armand Lévy (1795–1841), mathematician
 Azriel Lévy (born 1934), mathematical logic
 Hyman Levy (1889–1975), mathematician
 Paul Lévy (1886–1971), probability theory
 Tony Lévy (born 1943), history of mathematics
 Hans Lewy (1904–1988), mathematician; Wolf Prize (1986)
 Gabriel Judah Lichtenfeld (1811–1887), mathematician
 Leon Lichtenstein (1878–1933), differential equations, conformal mapping, and potential theory
 Paulette Libermann (1919–2007), differential geometry
 Elliott Lieb (born 1932), mathematical physics
 Lillian Lieber (1886–1986), mathematician and popular author
 Heinrich Liebmann (1874–1939), differential geometry
 Michael Lin (born 1942), Markov chains and ergodic theory
 Baruch Lindau (1759–1849), mathematician and science writer
 Adolf Lindenbaum (1904–1942), mathematical logic
 Elon Lindenstrauss (born 1970), mathematician; Erdős Prize (2009), Fields Medal (2010)
 Joram Lindenstrauss (1936–2012), mathematician
 Yom Tov Lipman Lipkin (1846–1876), mathematician
 Rudolf Lipschitz (1832–1903), mathematical analysis and differential geometry
 Rehuel Lobatto (1797–1866), mathematician
 Michel Loève (1907–1979), probability theory 
 Charles Loewner (1893–1968), mathematician
 Alfred Loewy (1873–1935), representation theory
 Gino Loria (1862–1954), mathematician and historian of mathematics
 Leopold Löwenheim (1878–1957), mathematical logic
 Baruch Solomon Löwenstein (19th century), mathematician
 Alexander Lubotzky (born 1956), mathematician and politician; Erdős Prize (1990)
 Eugene Lukacs (1906–1987), statistician
 Yudell Luke (1918–1983), function theory
 Jacob Lurie (born 1977), mathematician; Breakthrough Prize (2014)
 George Lusztig (born 1946), mathematician; Cole Prize (1985), Steele Prize (2008)
 Israel Lyons (1739–1775), mathematician
 Lazar Lyusternik (1899–1981), topology and differential geometry

M
 Myrtil Maas (1792–1865), mathematician
 Moshé Machover (born 1936), mathematician, philosopher and activist
 Menachem Magidor (born 1946), set theory
 Ludwig Immanuel Magnus (1790–1861), geometer
 Kurt Mahler (1903–1988), mathematician; De Morgan Medal (1971)
 Yuri Manin (born 1937), algebraic geometry and diophantine geometry
 Henry Mann (1905–2000), number theory and statistics; Cole Prize (1946)
 Amédée Mannheim (1831–1906), mathematician and inventor of the slide rule
 Eli Maor (born 1937), history of mathematics
 Solomon Marcus (1925–2016), mathematical analysis, mathematical linguistics and computer science
 Szolem Mandelbrojt (1899–1983), mathematical analysis
 Benoit Mandelbrot (1924–2010), mathematician; Wolf Prize (1993)
 Grigory Margulis (born 1946), mathematician; Fields Medal (1978), Wolf Prize (2005), Abel Prize (2020)
 Edward Marczewski (1907–1976), mathematician
 Michael Maschler (1927–2008), game theory
 Walther Mayer (1887–1948), mathematician 
 Barry Mazur (born 1937), mathematician; Cole Prize (1982)
 Vladimir Mazya (born 1937), mathematical analysis and partial differential equations
 Naum Meiman (1912–2001), complex analysis, partial differential equations, and mathematical physics
 Nathan Mendelsohn (1917–2006), discrete mathematics
 Karl Menger (1902–1985), mathematician
 Abraham Joseph Menz (18th century), mathematician and rabbi
 Yves Meyer (born 1939), mathematician; Abel Prize (2017)
 Ernest Michael (1925–2013), general topology
 Solomon Mikhlin (1908–1990), mathematician
 David Milman (1912–1982), functional analysis
 Pierre Milman (born 1945), mathematician
 Vitali Milman (born 1939), mathematical analysis
 Hermann Minkowski (1864–1909), number theory
Richard von Mises (1883–1953), mathematician and engineer
 Elijah Mizrachi ( 1455– 1525), mathematician and rabbi
 Boris Moishezon (1937–1993), mathematician
 Louis Mordell (1888–1972), number theory
 Claus Moser (1922–2015), statistics
 George Mostow (1923–2017), mathematician; Wolf Prize (2013)
 Andrzej Mostowski (1913–1975), set theory
 Simon Motot (15th century), algebra
 Theodore Motzkin (1908–1970), mathematician
 José Enrique Moyal (1910–1998), mathematical physics
 Herman Müntz (1884–1956), mathematician

N
 Leopoldo Nachbin (1922–1993), topology and harmonic analysis
 Assaf Naor (born 1975), metric spaces; Bôcher Prize (1999)
 Isidor Natanson (1906–1964), real analysis and constructive function theory
 Melvyn Nathanson (born 1944), number theory
 Caryn Navy (born 1953), set-theoretic topology
 Mark Naimark (1909–1978), functional analysis and mathematical physics
 Zeev Nehari (1915–1978), mathematical analysis
 Rabbi Nehemiah (  150), mathematician
 Leonard Nelson (1882–1927), mathematician and philosopher
 Paul Nemenyi (1895–1952), mathematician and physicist
 Peter Nemenyi (1927–2002), mathematician
 Abraham Nemeth (1918–2013), mathematician and creator of Nemeth Braille
 Arkadi Nemirovski (born 1947), optimization
 Elisha Netanyahu (1912–1986), complex analysis
 Bernhard Neumann (1909–2003), group theory
John von Neumann (1903–1957), set theory, physics and computer science; Bôcher Prize (1938)
 Hanna Neumann (1914–1971), group theory
 Klára Dán von Neumann (1911–1963), mathematician and computer scientist
 Nelli Neumann (1886–1942), synthetic geometry
 Max Newman (1897–1984), mathematician and codebreaker; De Morgan Medal (1962)
 Abraham Niederländer (16th century), mathematician and scribe
 Louis Nirenberg (1925–2020), mathematical analysis; Bôcher Prize (1959), Steele Prize (1994), Chern Medal (2010), Abel Prize (2015)
 Emmy Noether (1882–1935), algebra and theoretical physics
 Fritz Noether (1884–1941), mathematician
 Max Noether (1844–1921), algebraic geometry and algebraic functions
 Simon Norton (1952–2019), group theory
 Pedro Nunes (1502–1578), mathematician and cosmographer
 A. Edward Nussbaum (1925–2009), mathematician and theoretical physicist

O
 David Oppenheim (1664–1736), rabbi and mathematician
 Menachem Oren (1903–1962), mathematician and chess master
 Donald Ornstein (born 1934), ergodic theory; Bôcher Prize (1974)
 Mollie Orshansky (1915–2006), statistics
 Steven Orszag (1943–2011), applied mathematics
 Stanley Osher (born 1942), applied mathematics
 Robert Osserman (1926–2011), geometry
 Alexander Ostrowski (1893–1986), mathematician
 Jacques Ozanam (1640–1718), mathematician

P–Q
 Alessandro Padoa (1868–1937), mathematician and logician
 Emanuel Parzen (1929–2016), statistician
 Seymour Papert (1928–2016), mathematician and computer scientist
 Moritz Pasch (1843–1930), foundations of geometry
 Chaim Pekeris (1908–1992), mathematician and physicist
 Daniel Pedoe (1910–1998), geometry
 Rudolf Peierls (1907–1995), physics and applied mathematics; Copley Medal (1996)
 Rose Peltesohn (1913–1998), combinatorics
 Grigori Perelman (born 1966), mathematician; Fields Medal (2006, declined), Millennium Prize (2010)
 Yakov Perelman (1882–1942), recreational mathematics
 Micha Perles (born 1936), graph theory and discrete geometry
 Leo Perutz (1882–1957), mathematician and novelist
 Rózsa Péter (1905–1977), recursion theory
 Ralph Phillips (1913–1998), functional analysis; Steele Prize (1997)
 Ilya Piatetski-Shapiro (1929–2009), mathematician; Wolf Prize (1990)
 Georg Pick (1859–1942), mathematician
 Salvatore Pincherle (1853–1936), functional analysis
 Abraham Plessner (1900–1961), functional analysis
 Felix Pollaczek (1892–1981), number theory, mathematical analysis, mathematical physics and probability theory
 Harriet Pollatsek (born 1942), mathematician
 Leonid Polterovich (born 1963), symplectic geometry and dynamical systems; Erdős Prize (1998)
 George Pólya (1887–1985), combinatorics, number theory, numerical analysis and probability
 Carl Pomerance (born 1944), number theory
 Alfred van der Poorten (1942–2010), number theory
 Emil Post (1897–1954), mathematician and logician
 Mojżesz Presburger (1904– 1943), mathematician and logician
 Vera Pless (1931–2020), combinatorics
 Ilya Prigogine (1917–2003), statistician and chemist; Nobel Prize in Chemistry (1977)
 Alfred Pringsheim (1850–1941), analysis, theory of functions
 Moshe Provençal (1503–1576) mathematician, posek and grammarian
 Heinz Prüfer (1896–1934), mathematician
 Hilary Putnam (1926–2016), philosophy of mathematics

R
 Michael Rabin (born 1931), mathematical logic and computer science; Turing Award (1976)
 Philip Rabinowitz (1926–2006), numerical analysis
 Giulio Racah (1909–1965), mathematician and physicist
 Richard Rado (1906–1989), mathematician
 Aleksander Rajchman (1890–1940), measure theory
 Rose Rand (1903–1980), logician and philosopher
 Joseph Raphson ( 1648– 1715), mathematician
 Anatol Rapoport (1911–2007), applied mathematics
 Marina Ratner (1938–2017), ergodic theory
 Yitzchak Ratner (1857–?), mathematician
 Amitai Regev (born 1940), ring theory
 Isaac Samuel Reggio (1784–1855), mathematician and rabbi
 Hans Reissner (1874–1967), mathematical physics
 Robert Remak (1888–1942), algebra and mathematical economics
 Evgeny Remez (1895–1975), constructive function theory
 Alfréd Rényi (1921–1970), combinatorics, number theory and probability
 Ida Rhodes (1900–1986), mathematician
 Paulo Ribenboim (born 1928), number theory
 Ken Ribet (born 1948), algebraic number theory and algebraic geometry
 Frigyes Riesz (1880–1956), functional analysis
 Marcel Riesz (1886–1969), mathematician
 Eliyahu Rips (born 1948), geometric group theory; Erdős Prize(1979)
 Joseph Ritt (1893–1951), differential algebra
 Igor Rivin (born 1961), hyperbolic geometry, topology, group theory, experimental mathematics.
 Abraham Robinson (1918–1974), nonstandard analysis
 Olinde Rodrigues (1795–1851), mathematician and social reformer
 Werner Rogosinski (1894–1964), mathematician
 Vladimir Rokhlin (1919–1984), mathematician
 Werner Romberg (1909–2003), mathematician and physicist
 Jakob Rosanes (1842–1922), algebraic geometry and invariant theory
 Johann Rosenhain (1816–1887), mathematician
 Louis Rosenhead (1906–1984), applied mathematics
 Maxwell Rosenlicht (1924–1999), algebra; Cole Prize (1960)
 Arthur Rosenthal (1887–1959), mathematician
 Klaus Roth (1925–2015), diophantine approximation; Fields Medal (1958)
 Leonard Roth (1904–1968), algebraic geometry
 Uriel Rothblum (1947–2012), mathematician and operations researcher
 Bruce Rothschild (born 1941), combinatorics; Pólya Prize (1971)
 Linda Preiss Rothschild (born 1945), mathematician
 Arthur Rubin (born 1956), mathematician and aerospace engineer
 Karl Rubin (born 1956), elliptic curves; Cole Prize (1992)
 Reuven Rubinstein (1938–2012), probability theory and statistics
 Walter Rudin (1921–2010), mathematical analysis
 Zeev Rudnick (born 1961), number theory and mathematical physics; Erdős Prize (2001)

S
 Saadia Gaon (882 or 892–942), rabbi, philosopher and mathematician
 Louis Saalschütz (1835–1913), number theory and mathematical analysis
 Cora Sadosky (1940–2010), mathematical analysis
 Manuel Sadosky (1914–2005), mathematician and computer scientist
 Philip Saffman (1931–2008), applied mathematics
 Stanisław Saks (1897–1942), measure theory
 Raphaël Salem (1898–1963), mathematician
 Hans Samelson (1916–2005), differential geometry, topology, Lie groups and Lie algebras
 Ester Samuel-Cahn (1933–2015), statistician
 Peter Sarnak (born 1953), analytic number theory; Pólya Prize (1998), Cole Prize (2005), Wolf Prize (2014)
 Leonard Jimmie Savage (1917–1971), mathematician and statistician
 Shlomo Sawilowsky (1954–2021), statistician
 Hermann Schapira (1840–1898), mathematician
 Malka Schaps (born 1948), mathematician
 Michelle Schatzman (1949–2010), applied mathematics
 Robert Schatten (1911–1977), functional analysis
 Juliusz Schauder (1899–1943), functional analysis and partial differential equations
 Menahem Max Schiffer (1911–1997), complex analysis, partial differential equations, and mathematical physics
 Ludwig Schlesinger (1864–1933), mathematician
 Lev Schnirelmann (1905–1938), calculus of variations, topology and number theory
 Isaac Schoenberg (1903–1990), mathematician
 Arthur Schoenflies (1853–1928), mathematician
 Moses Schönfinkel (1889–1942), combinatory logic
 Oded Schramm (1961–2008), conformal field theory and probability theory; Erdős Prize (1996), Pólya Prize (2006)
 Józef Schreier (1909–1943), functional analysis, group theory and combinatorics
 Otto Schreier (1901–1929), group theory
 Issai Schur (1875–1941), group representations, combinatorics and number theory
 Arthur Schuster (1851–1934), applied mathematics; Copley Medal (1931)
 Albert Schwarz (born 1934), differential topology
 Karl Schwarzschild (1873–1916), mathematical physics
 Jacob Schwartz (1930–2009), mathematician
 Laurent Schwartz (1915–2002), mathematician; Fields Medal (1950)
 Marie-Hélène Schwartz (1913–2013), mathematician
 Richard Schwartz (born 1934), mathematician and activist
 Irving Segal (1918–1998), functional and harmonic analysis
 Lee Segel (1932–2005), applied mathematics
 Beniamino Segre (1903–1977), algebraic geometry
 Corrado Segre (1863–1924), algebraic geometry
 Wladimir Seidel (1907–1981), mathematician
 Esther Seiden (1908–2014), statistics
 Abraham Seidenberg (1916–1988), algebra
 Gary Seitz (born 1943), group theory
 Zlil Sela (born 1962), geometric group theory; Erdős Prize (2003)
 Reinhard Selten (1930–2016), mathematician and game theorist; Nobel Prize in Economics (1994)
 Valery Senderov (1945–2014), mathematician
 Aner Shalev (born 1958), group theory
 Jeffrey Shallit (born 1957), number theory and computer science
 Adi Shamir (born 1952), mathematician and cryptographer; Erdős Prize (1983)
 Eli Shamir (born 1934), mathematician and computer scientist
 Harold Shapiro (1928–2021), approximation theory and functional analysis
 Samuil Shatunovsky (1859–1929), mathematical analysis and algebra
 Henry Sheffer (1882–1964), logician
 Saharon Shelah (born 1945), mathematician; Erdős Prize (1977), Pólya Prize (1992), Wolf Prize (2001)
 James Shohat (1886–1944), mathematical analysis
 Naum Shor (1937–2006), optimization
 William Sidis (1898–1944), mathematician and child prodigy
 Barry Simon (born 1946), mathematical physicist; Steele Prize (2016)
 Leon Simon (born 1945), mathematician; Bôcher Prize (1994)
 Max Simon (1844–1918), history of mathematics
 James Simons (born 1938), mathematician and hedge fund manager
 Yakov Sinai (born 1935), dynamical systems; Wolf Prize (1997), Steele Prize (2013), Abel Prize (2014)
 Isadore Singer (1924–2021), mathematician; Bôcher Prize (1969), Steele Prize (2000), Abel Prize (2004)
 Abraham Sinkov (1907–1998), mathematician and cryptanalyst
 Hayyim Selig Slonimski (1810–1904), mathematician and astronomer; Demidov Prize (1844)
 Raymond Smullyan (1919–2017), mathematician and philosopher
 Alan Sokal (born 1955), combinatorics and mathematical physics
 Robert Solovay (born 1938), set theory
 David Spiegelhalter (born 1953), statistician
 Daniel Spielman (born 1970), applied mathematics and computer science; Pólya Prize (2014)
 Frank Spitzer (1996–1992), probability theory
 Guido Stampacchia (1922–1978), mathematician
 Elias Stein (1931–2018), harmonic analysis; Wolf Prize (1999), Steele Prize (2002)
 Robert Steinberg (1922–2014), mathematician
 Mark Steiner (1942–2020), philosophy of mathematics
 Hugo Steinhaus (1887–1972), mathematician
 Ernst Steinitz (1871–1928), algebra
 Moritz Steinschneider (1816–1907), history of mathematics
 Abraham Stern ( 1762–1842), mathematician and inventor
 Moritz Abraham Stern (1807–1894), first Jewish full professor at a German university
 Shlomo Sternberg (born 1936), mathematician
 Reinhold Strassmann (1893–1944), mathematician
 Ernst Straus (1922–1983), analytic number theory, graph theory and combinatorics
 Steven Strogatz (born 1959), nonlinear systems and applied mathematics
 Daniel Stroock (born 1940), probability theory
 Eduard Study (1862–1930), invariant theory and geometry
 Bella Subbotovskaya (1938–1982), mathematician and founder of the Jewish People's University
 Benny Sudakov (born 1969), combinatorics
 James Joseph Sylvester (1814–1897), mathematician; Copley Medal (1880), De Morgan Medal (1887)
 Otto Szász (1884–1952), real analysis
 Gábor Szegő (1895–1985), mathematical analysis
 Esther Szekeres (1910–2005), mathematician
 George Szekeres (1911–2005), mathematician
 Peter Szūsz (1924–2008), number theory

T–U
 Dov Tamari (1911–2006), logic and combinatorics
 Jacob Tamarkin (1888–1945), mathematical analysis
 Éva Tardos (born 1957), mathematician and computer scientist
 Alfred Tarski (1901–1983), logician, mathematician, and philosopher
 Alfred Tauber (1866–1942), mathematical analysis
 Olga Taussky (1906–1995), algebraic number theory and algebra
 Olry Terquem (1782–1862), mathematician
 Otto Toeplitz (1881–1940), linear algebra and functional analysis
 Jakow Trachtenberg (1888–1953), mathematician and mental calculator
 Avraham Trahtman (born 1944), combinatorics
 Boris Trakhtenbrot (1921–2016), mathematical logic
 Boaz Tsaban (born 1973), set theory and nonabelian cryptology
 Jacob Tsimerman (born 1988), number theory
 Boris Tsirelson (1950–2020), probability theory and functional analysis
 Pál Turán (1910–1976), number theory
 Eli Turkel (born 1944), applied mathematics
 Stanislaw Ulam (1909–1984), mathematician
 Fritz Ursell (1923–2012), mathematician
 Pavel Urysohn (1898–1924), dimension theory and topology

V
Vladimir Vapnik (born 1936), mathematician and computer scientist 
 Moshe Vardi (born 1954), mathematical logic and theoretical computer science
 Andrew Vázsonyi (1916–2003), mathematician and operations researcher
 Anatoly Vershik (born 1933), mathematician
 Naum Vilenkin (1920–1991), combinatorics
 Vilna Gaon (1720–1797), Talmudist and mathematician
 Giulio Vivanti (1859–1949), mathematician
 Aizik Volpert (1923–2006), mathematician and chemical engineer
Vito Volterra (1860–1940), functional analysis
 Vladimir Vranić (1896–1976), probability and statistics

W
 Friedrich Waismann (1896–1950), mathematician and philosopher
 Abraham Wald (1902–1950), decision theory, geometry and econometrics
 Henri Wald (1920–2002), logician
 Arnold Walfisz (1892–1962), analytic number theory
 Stefan Warschawski (1904–1989), mathematician
 Wolfgang Wasow (1909–1993), singular perturbation theory
 André Weil (1906–1998), number theory and algebraic geometry; Wolf Prize (1979), Steele Prize (1980), Kyoto Prize (1994)
 Shmuel Weinberger (born 1963), topology
 Alexander Weinstein (1897–1979), applied mathematics
Eric Weinstein (born 1965), mathematical physics
 Boris Weisfeiler (1942–1985?), algebraic geometry
 Benjamin Weiss (born 1941), mathematician
 Wendelin Werner (born 1968), probability theory and mathematical physics; Pólya Prize (2006), Fields Medal (2006)
 Eléna Wexler-Kreindler (1931–1992), algebra
 Harold Widom (1932–2021), operator theory and random matrices; Pólya Prize (2002)
 Norbert Wiener (1894–1964), mathematician; Bôcher Prize (1933)
 Avi Wigderson (born 1956), mathematician and computer scientist, Abel Prize (2021)
 Eugene Wigner (1902–1995), mathematician and theoretical physicist; Nobel Prize in Physics (1963)
 Ernest Julius Wilczynski (1876–1932), geometer
 Herbert Wilf (1931–2012), combinatorics and graph theory
 Aurel Wintner (1903–1958), mathematician
 Daniel Wise (born 1971), geometric group theory and 3-manifolds
 Edward Witten (born 1951), mathematical physics; Fields Medal (1990), Kyoto Prize (2014)
 Ludwig Wittgenstein (1889–1951), logic and philosophy of mathematics
 Julius Wolff (1882–1945), mathematician
 Jacob Wolfowitz (1910–1981), statistics
 Paul Wolfskehl (1856–1906), mathematician
 Mario Wschebor (1939–2011), probability and statistics

X–Z
 Mordecai Yoffe ( 1530–1612), rabbi and mathematician
 Akiva Yaglom (1921–2007), probability and statistics
 Isaak Yaglom (1921–1988), mathematician
 Sofya Yanovskaya (1896–1966), logic and history of mathematics
 Adolph Yushkevich (1906–1993), history of mathematics
 Abraham Zacuto (1452– 1515), mathematician and astronomer
 Lotfi Zadeh (1921–2017), fuzzy mathematics
 Pedro Zadunaisky (1917–2009), mathematician and astronomer
 Don Zagier (born 1951), number theory; Cole Prize (1987)
 Elijah Zahalon (18th century), mathematician and Talmudist
 Zygmunt Zalcwasser (1898–1943), mathematician
 Victor Zalgaller (1920–2020), geometry and optimization
 Israel Zamosz ( 1700–1772), Talmudist and mathematician
 Oscar Zariski (1899–1986), algebraic geometer; Cole Prize (1944), Wolf Prize (1981), Steele Prize (1981)
 Edouard Zeckendorf (1901–1983), number theory
 Doron Zeilberger (born 1950), combinatorics
 Efim Zelmanov (born 1955), mathematician; Fields Medal (1994)
 Tamar Ziegler (born 1971), ergodic theory and arithmetic combinatorics; Erdős Prize (2011)
 Leo Zippin (1905–1995), solved Hilbert's fifth problem
 Abraham Ziv (1940–2013), number theory
 Benedict Zuckermann (1818–1891), mathematician and historian
 Moses Zuriel (16th century), mathematician

See also
 Lists of Jews
 List of Jewish American mathematicians
 List of Israeli mathematicians
 Mishnat ha-Middot

References

Sources
 
 

Mathematicians
Jewish